Chagall most commonly refers to Marc Chagall (1887-1985), Belarusian-Jewish-French artist

Chagall may also refer to:

Chagall (film), 1963 short documentary film
Chagall (restaurant), former restaurant in Leidschendam, Netherlands
2981 Chagall, main belt asteroid

Other people with the surname
Bella Rosenfeld Chagall (1895-1944), writer and wife of Marc Chagall
Rachel Chagall (born 1952), American actress
Nic Chagall (born 1972), German music producer

See also

Chagal or Chakal, village in Iran 
Chagall Guevara, American rock band